Gómez Farías metro station is a station of the Mexico City Metro in Venustiano Carranza, Mexico City. It is an underground station with two side platforms served by Line 1 (the Pink Line) between Boulevard Puerto Aéreo and Zaragoza stations. It serves the colonias (neighborhoods) of Federal and Gómez Farías; the station receives its name from the latter, which in turn is named after Valentín Gómez Farías, the seventh president of Mexico (he served intermittently from 1833 to 1847). The pictogram depicts a representation of the Mexican Constitution of 1857, which was promoted by Gómez Farías during his tenure as the president of Congress. Gómez Farías metro station opened on 4 September 1969 with service westward toward Chapultepec station and eastward toward Zaragoza station. The facilities are partially accessible for people with disabilities as it has escalators. In 2019, the station had an average daily ridership of 28,385 passengers, making it the 48th busiest station in the network and the 11th busiest of the line. Since 11 July 2022, the station has remained closed due to modernization works on the tunnel and the line's technical equipment.

Location

Gómez Farías is a metro station located along Calzada Ignacio Zaragoza, in Venustiano Carranza, Mexico City. The station serves the colonias (Mexican Spanish for "neighborhoods") of Federal and Gómez Farías. Within the system, the station lies between Boulevard Puerto Aéreo and Zaragoza.

Exits
There are two exits:
North: Calzada Ignacio Zaragoza and Relaciones Exteriores Street, Federal.
South: Calzada Ignacio Zaragoza and 31 Street, Gómez Farías.

History and construction
Line 1 of the Mexico City Metro was built by Ingeniería de Sistemas de Transportes Metropolitano, Electrometro and Cometro, the last one a subsidiary of Empresas ICA. Its first section opened on 4 September 1969, operating from Chapultepec to Zaragoza stations. The station's pictogram features a silhouette of a representation of the Mexican Constitution of 1857, which was promoted by Valentín Gómez Farías during his tenure as the president of Congress.

It has a partially disabled-accessible service with escalators. The station will be closed in 2022 for modernization work on the tunnel and technical equipment of the line.

Ridership
According to the data provided by the authorities, between 2011 and 2021, commuters averaged between 20,100 and 42,300 daily entrances. In 2019, before the impact of the COVID-19 pandemic on public transport, the station's ridership totaled 10,360,851 passengers, which was a decrease of 1,800,444 passengers compared to 2018. In the same year, Gómez Farías metro station was the 48th busiest station of the system's 195 stations, and it was the line's 11th busiest.

Notes

References

External links

 

1969 establishments in Mexico
Accessible Mexico City Metro stations
Mexico City Metro Line 1 stations
Mexico City Metro stations in Venustiano Carranza, Mexico City
Railway stations located underground in Mexico
Railway stations opened in 1969